Hegermila is a genus of fungi within the Hyaloscyphaceae family. The genus contains 4 species.

Species
As accepted by Species Fungorum;
 Hegermila andina 
 Hegermila crassispora 
 Hegermila octopartita 
 Hegermila vermispora

References

External links

Hyaloscyphaceae